The 2002 Lamar Hunt U.S. Open Cup, a tournament open to all soccer teams in the United States, ran from June through October.

The Columbus Crew won the Cup with a 1–0 victory over the defending-champion Los Angeles Galaxy in the final at Columbus Crew Stadium. Just three days before, Los Angeles had won MLS Cup 2002.

Every third-round game featured an MLS team against an A-League squad. Although MLS won seven of the eight games, four went to overtime, including San Jose's memorable 4–3 win over Seattle. The Des Moines Menace turned in the best performance by a PDL team, taking Rochester to overtime in a 3-2 second-round loss.

Open Cup Bracket
Home teams listed on top of bracket

Schedule
Note: Scorelines use the standard U.S. convention of placing the home team on the right-hand side of box scores.

First round
Seven D3 Pro League, five PDL, and four USASA teams start.

Second round
Eight A-League teams enter.

Third round
Eight MLS teams enter.

Quarterfinals

Semifinals

Final

Top scorers

See also
 United States Soccer Federation
 Lamar Hunt U.S. Open Cup
 Major League Soccer
 United Soccer Leagues
 USASA
 National Premier Soccer League

2002 domestic association football cups
Cup
2002